Brian Dabul and Marcel Felder were the defending champions, but only Felder tried to defend his title.
He partnered with Juan-Pablo Amado, but they lost to Joshua Goodall and Samuel Groth in the semis.
Goodall and Groth won this tournament, by defeating Rogério Dutra da Silva and Júlio Silva 7–6(4), 6–3 in the final.

Seeds

Draw

Draw

References
 Doubles Draw

Credicard Citi MasterCard Tennis Cup - Doubles
MasterCard Tennis Cup
Mast